Mary Jane Patterson (September 12, 1840 – September 24, 1894) was the first African-American woman to receive a B.A degree, in 1862.

Life 

Mary Jane Patterson was the oldest of Henry Irving Patterson and Emeline Eliza (Taylor) Patterson's children. There is conflicting data on how many siblings she had, but most sources cite between seven and ten.  Henry Patterson worked as a bricklayer and plasterer who gained his freedom, after Mary was born, in 1852. After this, he moved his family north to Ohio. The Pattersons settled in Oberlin, Ohio, in 1856. Oberlin had a large community of black families; some were freed slaves and some were fugitive slaves. Oberlin was popular because it had a racially integrated co-ed college. Henry Patterson worked as a master mason, and for many years the family boarded large numbers of black students in their home.

Teaching career 

"Mary Jane Patterson not only was the first black woman in the United States to earn a college degree, she did it by spurning the usual courses for women at Oberlin, and taking instead a program of Greek, Latin, and higher mathematics designed for 'gentlemen.'"<ref name=Sowell>[https://www.nationalaffairs.com/storage/app/uploads/public/58e/1a4/ba6/58e1a4ba616e4230354245.pdf Sowell, Thomas, Black excellence -- the case of Dunbar High School," The Public Interest, Spring 1974, p.7.]</ref> After graduation Patterson was listed as teaching in Chillicothe, Ohio. On September 21, 1864, she applied for a position in Norfolk, Virginia at a school for black children. On October 7, 1864, E. H. Fairchild, principal of Oberlin College's preparatory department from 1853 to 1869, wrote a recommendation for an "appointment from the American missionary Association as a ... teacher among freedmen." In this letter he described her as "a light quadroon, a graduate of this college, a superior scholar, a good singer, a faithful Christian, and a genteel lady. She had success is teaching and is worthy of the highest ... you pay to ladies."

In 1865 Patterson became an assistant to Fanny Jackson Coppin at the Philadelphia's Institute for Colored Youth (now Cheyney University of Pennsylvania). In 1869 to 1871 Patterson taught in Washington, D. C., at the Preparatory High School for Colored Youth known today as Dunbar High School (Washington, D.C.). She served as the school's first Black principal, from 1871 to 1872. Patterson was demoted and served as assistant principal under Richard Theodore Greener, the first black Harvard University graduate. She was reappointed from 1873 to 1884. During her administration, the school grew from less than 50 to 172 students, the name "Preparatory High School" was dropped, high school commencements were initiated, and a teacher-training department was added to the school. Patterson's commitment to thoroughness as well as her "forceful" and "vivacious" personality helped her establish the school's strong intellectual standards.  Patterson continued to teach at the High School until her death. While in D.C., Patterson lived with her sisters, Emma and Chanie, and her brother, John at 1532 Fifteenth Street Northwest.  In the Late 1880s Patterson's parents came to live with them due to financial difficulties. Neither Patterson nor her sisters ever married.

 Other pursuits 

Patterson was also a humanitarian and was active in many organizations. She devoted time and money to Black institutions in Washington, D. C.  Her obituary in the Evening Star said she "co-operated heartily in sustaining the Home for the Aged  and Infirm Colored People in this city and other Kindred organizations." Patterson was part of the Colored Woman's League of Washington D.C., which was committed to the "racial uplift" of colored women. The group focused on kindergarten teaching training, rescue work, and classes for industrial schools and homemaking.

 Death and legacy 

Patterson died at her Washington, D. C. home, September 24, 1894, at the age of 54. She is known as a pioneer in black education by paving the way for other black female educators.

 References 
 
Baumann,Roland M. "Patterson, Mary Jane." African American National Biography.'' Oxford African American Studies Center. 20 October 2009. <http://www.oxford.com/artical/opr/t001/e1694>.

African-American people
Oberlin College alumni
1840 births
1894 deaths
American educators
People from Raleigh, North Carolina
African-American college graduates before 1865